Jon Hill (born 20 August 1970) is a former English  footballer who played as a defender. Hill is currently assistant coach at Rotherham United.

References

1970 births
Living people
English footballers
Association football defenders
Rochdale A.F.C. players
English Football League players
Fulham F.C. non-playing staff 
Sheffield Wednesday F.C. non-playing staff 
Exeter City F.C. non-playing staff 
Rotherham United F.C. non-playing staff